Secret Agent X-9 (1937) is a Universal film serial based on the comic strip Secret Agent X-9 by Dashiell Hammett and Alex Raymond.

Plot 
G-Men learn that "Victor Brenda", a notorious jewel thief, is heading for the US, to steal the Belgravian crown jewels currently on exhibit. The jewels are placed on a ship bound for Belgravia. However, the guard is murdered and the treasures are stolen. Agent Dexter, alias Agent X-9, trails Blackstone, one of the gang members, who hides the jewels in a safe deposit vault of a bank. He takes the bank receipt to an art shop, where Marker, a paid accomplice, conceals it between an oil painting and its frame. Dexter arrests Blackstone and pursues Marker with the full intention of unmasking Brenda.

Cast
 Scott Kolk as Agent Dexter (X-9)
 Jean Rogers as Shara Graustark
 Henry Brandon as Blackstone/Victor T. Brenda
 David Oliver as Pidge
 Monte Blue as Baron Michael Karsten
 Lon Chaney, Jr. as Maroni, primary henchman
 Ben Hewlett as Scarlett, primary henchman
 Larry J. Blake as Chief FBI Agent Wheeler
 Henry Hunter as FBI Agent Tommy Dawson (C-5)
 George Shelley as Packard, a henchman
 Lynn Gilbert as Rose, gun moll
 Robert Dalton as Thurston
 Leonard Lord as Ransom, dissident henchman
 Bob Kortman as "Trader" Delaney
 Eddy Waller as Lawyer Carp
 Si Jenks as "Jolly Roger", ticket barker

Production
Secret Agent X-9 was based on the comic strip by Dashiell Hammett (writer) and Alex Raymond (artist).

Stunts
 George Magrill
 Eddie Parker doubling Scott Kolk
 Tom Steele doubling Henry Brandon & Jack Cheatham

Chapter titles
 Modern Pirates
 The Ray That Blinds
 The Man of Many Faces
 The Listening Shadow
 False Fires
 The Dragnet
 Sealed Lips
 Exhibit A
 The Masquerader
 The Forced Lie
 The Enemy Camp
 Crime Does Not Pay
Source:

References

External links

1937 films
American black-and-white films
1930s English-language films
Films based on comic strips
Films based on works by Alex Raymond
Universal Pictures film serials
American spy films
Films directed by Ford Beebe
1930s crime films
Films based on works by Dashiell Hammett
American crime films
1930s American films